Concórdia Futebol Clube, commonly known as Concórdia, is a Brazilian football club based in Concórdia, Santa Catarina state.

History
The club was founded on May 9, 2003.

Stadium
Concórdia Futebol Clube play their home games at Estádio Domingos Machado de Lima. The stadium has a maximum capacity of 3,000 people.

References

Association football clubs established in 2003
Football clubs in Santa Catarina (state)
2003 establishments in Brazil